"Babyshambles" is the first single by Pete Doherty's post-Libertines band of the same name.  It was released in April 2004 on High Society Records. The single was limited to 2,000 copies of the CD and 1,000 copies of the 7" vinyl and both can now be found changing hands for more than £100 on Internet auction sites. It peaked at number No. 32 on the UK Singles Chart.

Track listing 
CD
 "Babyshambles"
 "Flophouse"
 "What Katie did"

7"
 "Babyshambles"
 "Flophouse"

Chart performance

References

2004 debut singles
Babyshambles songs
2004 songs